John Smith Phelps (December 22, 1814November 20, 1886) was a politician and soldier during the American Civil War, and the 23rd Governor of Missouri.

Early life and career
John Smith Phelps, the son of Elisha Phelps, was born in Simsbury, Hartford County, Connecticut. He attended common schools and then studied law at Trinity College in Hartford, Connecticut, graduating in 1832. He was admitted to the bar in 1835 and commenced practice in Simsbury. After his marriage to Mary Whitney on April 20, 1837,  he moved to Springfield, Missouri, and quickly became one of the leading lawyers in southwest Missouri.

Phelps was elected to the Missouri House of Representatives in 1840. Four years later, on March 4, 1845, he was elected as a Democrat to the Twenty-Ninth Congress, and to eight succeeding Congresses (March 4, 1845March 3, 1863). During his 18-year term, he served as Chairman of the Committee on Ways and Means (Thirty-Fifth Congress) and came to be regarded as a champion of government bounties to soldiers, aid to railroads, and inexpensive postage.

Phelps was popular in Washington, D.C. and at home. In 1857 Missourians honored him by naming the newly created county of Phelps after him. He was not a candidate for renomination in 1862.

Civil War
At the outbreak of the Civil War in 1861, Phelps returned to Springfield and enlisted as a private in Captain Coleman's Company of Missouri Infantry (Union). He was promoted to lieutenant colonel on October 2, 1861 and to colonel December 19, 1861. Following the Union defeat at the Battle of Wilson's Creek, Mary Phelps cared for the body of General Nathaniel Lyon, killed during the battle, while her husband retreated with the Union army to Rolla. By special arrangement with President Abraham Lincoln, Phelps organized an infantry regiment which bore his name, Phelps’s Regiment, Missouri Volunteer Infantry. The regiment spent most of the winter of 1861—62 as the garrison of Fort Wyman at Rolla. In March 1862, Phelps led his regiment in the fierce fighting at Pea Ridge in Arkansas. He was mustered out May 13, 1862. In July 1862, he was appointed by President Lincoln as Military Governor of Arkansas, but he resigned the position due to ill health.

Postbellum activities

Phelps returned to Springfield in 1864 to resume his law practice. He was an unsuccessful candidate for Governor of Missouri in 1868, but in 1876 was elected to the position as the only candidate who could successfully lead Northern and Southern factions in the state. During his tenure as governor, Phelps supported currency reform and increased support for public education. He retired in 1881, praised as one of Missouri’s best governors.

John Smith Phelps died in St. Louis, Missouri. He rests in Hazelwood Cemetery in Springfield, Missouri.

See also

List of American Civil War generals (Union)

References

External links

 Retrieved on 2008-11-01

1814 births
1886 deaths
People from Simsbury, Connecticut
Democratic Party governors of Missouri
People of Missouri in the American Civil War
Union Army colonels
Democratic Party members of the United States House of Representatives from Missouri
19th-century American politicians
Deans of the United States House of Representatives